The women's 200 metre breaststroke event at the 1936 Summer Olympics, took place from 8 to 11 August, at the (50 m) Olympiapark Schwimmstadion Berlin. It was the fourth appearance of the event, which first appeared at the 1924 Summer Olympics in Paris. A total of 23 competitors from 12 nations participated in the event.

The world record holder at the time, Japanese Hideko Maehata, won the event four years after losing the gold medal to Australian Clare Dennis by one tenth of a second. Twentyfour-year-old German silver medalist Martha Genenger broke the Olympic record in her heat on 8 August, but Maebata broke it again in the next heat with a time of 3:01.9 seconds. Danish Inge Sørensen won the bronze medal, becoming the youngest ever female Olympic medalist (12 years, 24 days). Sørensen's compatriot Valborg Christensen was favoured to win a medal in this event, but she was eliminated after finishing fifth in her semifinal.

Records 
Prior to this competition, the existing world and Olympic records were:

The following records were established during the competition:

Results

Heats
The three fastest swimmers of each heat and the next two fastest swimmers overall (Hanni Hölzner and Dorothy Schiller) advanced to the semifinals on 9 August.

Heat 1

Heat 2

Heat 3

Heat 4

Semifinals
The three fastest swimmers of both semifinals and the best fourth-place finisher advanced to the final on 11 August.

Semifinal 1

Semifinal 2

Final

References

General

Specific

Swimming at the 1936 Summer Olympics
1936 in women's swimming
SWim